Tamás Dala (born 5 June 1968) is a Hungarian male former water polo player. He was a member of the Hungary men's national water polo team. He competed with the team at the 1996 Summer Olympics.

References

External links
 

1968 births
Living people
Hungarian male water polo players
Olympiacos Water Polo Club players
Water polo players at the 1996 Summer Olympics
Olympic water polo players of Hungary
People from Tatabánya
Sportspeople from Komárom-Esztergom County